Fluxus Music is an independent record label based in South Korea.

History
It was formed in 2002 by Kim Byung-chan (also known as Chan Kim) (an alumnus of the Berklee College of Music), who worked as a sound engineer, opened Nanjang Communications and acted directly as a musician at Korean rock band Boohwal and the United States local band Out of the Blue. Putting all his experiences and know-hows accumulated from being an artist, producer and engineer he stood independently from Nanjang Communication and established Fluxus Music.
The label took its name from Fluxus, the avant-garde art movement of the 1960s, for show the aim for music that always flow with the change that never stagnant.

Trivia
Fluxus Music is evaluated as one of the Korean record labels that make music well mixed with musicality and commercialism from South Korea's music scene. Actually all its artists are self-producing musicians who are also singers-song writers. 
As a representative label in South Korea music scene from 2000s, it found success with musicians of various genres such as Clazziquai, Yi Sung-yol and Urban Zakapa.

Fluxus Music was also awarded 8 times in the Korean Music Awards including its 1st 'Record Label of the Year', the most record for a label.

Fluxus Music also owns a sub-label called Interplay.

Artists

Present
Fluxus Music
 Clazziquai (Clazziquai Project)
 Yi Sung-yol
 W & Jas
 Bye Bye Sea (Annyeong Bada)
 Eastern Sidekick
 From the Airport
 Loveholics
 Handsome People
 Yang Jin-suk
 Kim Hyo-yeon

Interplay
 Small O
 Ibadi
 Ggotjam Project
 Choi Woo-joon (Saza Choi)

Former
 W & Whale
 Winterplay (now under Loudpigs Music)
 My Aunt Mary
 Lee Seung-hwan (now under Dream Factory)
 Hong Jin-kyung
 Park Ki-young
 Alex Chu (now under SI Entertainment but still a Clazziquai member)
 Tei (now under Kiroy Company)
 Urban Zakapa (now under Abyss Company)

References

External links
 

Record labels established in 2002
Electronic dance music record labels
Alternative rock record labels
Indie rock record labels
South Korean record labels
Labels distributed by Kakao M